LIQ or liq may refer to:

 LIQ, the IATA code for Lisala Airport, Democratic Republic of the Congo
 liq, the ISO 639-3 code for Libido language, Ethiopia